
Gmina Bieliny is a rural gmina (administrative district) in Kielce County, Świętokrzyskie Voivodeship, in south-central Poland.

The gmina contains part of the protected area called Cisów-Orłowiny Landscape Park.

Villages
Gmina Bieliny contains the villages and settlements of Belno, Bieliny, Bieliny Poduchowne, Czaplów, Górki Napękowskie, Huta Podłysica, Kakonin, Lechów, Makoszyn, Napęków, Nowa Huta, Porąbki, Stara Huta, Stara Huta-Koszary and Szklana Huta.

Neighbouring gminas
Gmina Bieliny is bordered by the gminas of Bodzentyn, Daleszyce, Górno, Łagów and Nowa Słupia.

References
Polish official population figures 2006

Bieliny
Kielce County